Daeseongsan (Gangwon-do) is a mountain of South Korea. It has an altitude of 1175 metres

See also
List of mountains of Korea

References

Mountains of Gangwon Province, South Korea
Hwacheon County
Cheorwon County
Mountains of South Korea